Bishnupur is a city and a municipality of Bishnupur district in the state of West Bengal, India. It is famous for its terracotta temples built by the Malla rulers, historic Radha Krishna temples built during 1600–1800 CE and the Baluchari sarees.

History 
Bishnupur was ruled under the Gupta period by local Hindu kings who paid tribute to Samudra Gupta.  Following a long period of obscurity, where the land oscillated between being a minor independent principality and a vassal state. The land is also called Mallabhum after the Malla rulers of this place. The Malla rulers were Vaishnavites and built the famous terracotta temples during the 17th and 18th centuries at this place. The legends of Bipodtarini Devi are associated with Malla Kings of Bishnupur.

For almost a thousand years it was the capital of the Malla kings of Mallabhum, of which Bankura was a part, till their power waned during the times when Mughal Empire weakened under the last monarchs of the dynasty.

The patronage of Malla king Veer Hambir and his successors Raja Raghunath Singha Dev and Bir Singha Dev made Bishnupur one of the principal centres of culture in Bengal. Most of the exquisite terracotta temples for which town is justly famous were built during this period.

Mrinmoyee temple of kings is treated as a valuable historic place.

Royal patronage also gave rise to Bishnupur Gharana (school) of Hindustani classical music in late 18th-century and the Bishnupur school of painting.

Since 1997, the temples of Bishnupur is on the UNESCO World Heritage Site's Tentative list.

Geography

It has an average elevation of 59 metres (194 feet).

This area has fertile, low -lying alluvial plains. It is a predominantly rural area with 90.06% of the population living in rural areas and only 8.94% living in the urban areas. It was a part of the core area of Mallabhum.

Demographics
 India census, Bishnupur had a population of 61,943. Males constitute 50% of the population and females 50%. Bishnupur has an average literacy rate of 69%, higher than the national average of 59.5%; with male literacy of 77% and female literacy of 61%. 11% of the population is under 6 years of age.

Civic administration

CD block HQ
The headquarters of Bishnupur CD block are located at Bishnupur.

Police station
Bishnupur police station has jurisdiction over Bishnupur municipality and Bishnupur CD Block. The area covered is 365.73 km2 with a population of 138,786.

Language

Bishnupur is a region where Bengali has gained importance. Bengali is the primary dialect and main language of this region. More than 90% of the people of Bishnupur are Bengali.

Education

There are a number of well-known schools and colleges in Bishnupur. For higher education, there is a college named Ramananda College under Bankura University. There is also a music college named Ramsharan College of Music. The names of the schools are:
 Bishnupur High School (Bankura)
 Bishnupur Mahakuma Madhyamik Vidyalaya
 Bishnupur Krittibas Mukherjee High School.
 Sibdas Central Girls' High School.
 Bishnupur Parimal Debi Girls' High School.
 Kusumbani Jamundas Khemka High School.
 Bishnupur Mission High School.
 Bishnupur Public School-High, a co-educational, English-medium (recognised by West Bengal Board of Secondary Education as a Listed English School Under School Education Department Govt. of West Bengal)
 Bishnupur Public Primary Teachers' Training Institute, A D.El.Ed. College (recognised by N.C.T.E. & Affiliated to West Bengal Board of Primary Education)
 Bishnupur Public Institute of Education, A D.El.Ed. College (recognised by N.C.T.E. & Affiliated to West Bengal Board of Primary Education)
 Bishnupur Public-Private I.T.I., An Industrial Training Institute (Affiliated to DGE&T / N.C.V.T. Govt. of India, New Delhi & Accredited by Quality Council of India and Approved by Directorate of Industrial Training Govt. of West Bengal)
 Bishnupur Public Institute of Engineering, A Polytechnic College (approved by A.I.C.T.E. and affiliated with W.B.S.C.T. & V.E. & S.D)

Post-compulsory
K.G. Engineering Institute(KGEI) is a government polytechnic college; there are also Mallabhum Institute of Technology(MIT) is a private b.tech college affiliated to MAKAUT University and two private polytechnic colleges named Mallabhum Institute of Polytechnic (MIP).

Healthcare
Bishnupur has a 250-bedded District hospital and One Superspeciality Hospital with ICU Dep. at Rasikganja .

Transport

Bishnupur is reasonably well connected via roads. Due to its importance as a tourism destination, it is connected to almost all major places of Bengal. Long-distance buses connect Bishnupur to places like Tarakeswar, Durgapur, Asansol, Kolkata, Medinipur etc. There are regular and frequent bus services available between Bishnupur and Kolkata, Tarakeswar, Bardhaman, Khatra, Medinipur. The Kolkata bound buses usually leave Kolkata from the Esplanade bus stand. The journey takes about 4 hours and 45 minutes. 

Bishnupur is well-connected by rail to the rest of the country via Kharagpur and Adra. Express and mail trains ply between Kolkata and Bishnupur on a regular basis. The Rupashi Bangla Express, Aranyak Express and the Purulia Express are the most convenient trains to reach Bishnupur from Kolkata; these trains come via Kharagpur (Midnapur) and take approx 3:30 to 4:15 hours to reach Bishnupur from Kolkata.

Within the city of Bishnupur, private auto-rickshaws and cycle-rickshaws are the most convenient mode of communication. Recently CNG autos have been introduced plying through various parts of the town. These vehicles are environment-friendly, non-polluting, convenient, less time-consuming, and cheap mode of travel.

Nearest International Airport is at Dumdum, Kolkata (Netaji Subhash International airport) which is 140 km away; a smaller private airstrip at Panagarh belonging to the Indian Air Force is rarely used. A new airport in Andal has come up (90 km from Bishnupur).

Bishnupur is now a junction, it connects Tarakeswar (E.Railway) via Arambag.

Culture

The Bishnupur Mela is held every year around the last week of December, in Raj Darbar. Later on Bishnupur High School Ground and from Now it is held at Nandalal Temple Premises.

In 2018, the test of the Bishnupur Mela is totally changed. A big thanks to the administration for such an innovative idea to keep Bishnupur Terracotta Temples at the backdrop of the main stage. The Bishnupur Mela was inaugurated with the Gharana Music sung by some renowned persons from Bishnupur Gharana. In this year 2018, a fashion show with Baluchari Saree is introduced to promote Baluchari Saree at an international platform. Besides artisans got a huge income by selling crafts from the stalls of Mela. A recent addition is Bishnupur Utsab, held after the Mela. It is a classical music and dance festival in recognition of the 'Bishnupur Gharana' in music. It was stopped after 2012 but It started again on and from 2/2/2018 at Rashmancha.

Temples and other places

There are many such temples that stand testimony to the exquisite craftsmanship of the artisans of the region. The temples were crafted from the local laterite and brick. The temples are covered with terracotta tiles depicting scenes from the epic Mahabharata. The temples are located in Bishnupur and across many other small villages in the Bankura district. 

 Rasmancha (oldest brick temple with an elongated pyramidal tower Surrounded by hut-shaped turrets)
 Pancha Ratna Temple of Shyam Rai
 Jorebangla Temple of Keshta Rai
 Radha Madhab Temple
 Madanmohan Temple
 Dalmadal Kaman
 Lalgarh
 Lalbandh
 Acharya Jogesh Chandra Pura Kirti Bhavan(museum)
Bangiya Sahitya Parishad - Bishnupur Branch
 Gumgarh
 Pathar Darwaja (main gateway of Bishnupur)
 Garh Darwaja (small gateway of Bishnupur)
 Stone Chariot
 Nutan Mahal
 Bishnupur hawa mahal 
 Memorial of Shrinibas Acharya
 Gour-Nitai Temple (Tejpal)
 KeshabRai Temple (Patpur)

Music 
A school of music, called the Bishnupur Gharana, was established here in 1370 A.D and flourished under the patronage of the Malla kings. The school hit its peak in the 16th and 17th centuries. This style of music is rooted in the Dhrupad style and is still being kept alive in local academies of music. Pakhwaj, Sitar, Esraj comprise the main instruments. Bengali Ragpradhan is one of the Classical items of this gharana.

Products
Terracotta is characteristic of Bishnupur. Apart from the temples, terracotta pottery, artifacts and even jewelry made in this very traditional material are famous. The most famous of the terracotta products are the hand made beautiful jars, disks and the more famous of them are the terracotta horses, elephants, Ganesha, and Nataraj. But nowadays the skilled artists and potters are not present and also they make different products like faces, men, wall hangings and also the mini-sized Dal Madal Kaman (cannon). The potters here derive their inspiration from the glorious history of kings, soldiers, and wars.'Dokra', one kind of metalcraft is also famous.
Bishnupur is also famous for Baluchari Sari and Mallabhum Sari made of Tassar silk and was for almost a thousand years the capital of the Malla kings of Mallabhum. Woven on Jacquard punch-card looms, these sarees have episodes from the Mahabharata woven into the border and pallu.
Bellmetalware, conch-shell and terracotta jewelry is also available here.
The "Dashavatar Taas", kind of playing cards depicting ten avatars of Hindu god Vishnu, is drawn by hand. It is a rare art piece not to be found anywhere else in India.

Terracotta horses
Bankura horses are terracotta horses that were once used for religious purposes but are used as a decorative item. This art originated in Bankura district. These horses are known for their symmetrical shape and rounded curves. The Bankura or Panchmura horse gained popularity among art lovers since it was depicted in paintings by  M. F. Hussein.

Festivals and fairs

There is a snake festival in August, Ultorath and the Bishnupur fair in December. Also durga puja and kali puja or diwali is celebrated with pomp here. The Rajbari Durga Puja (also popular as Mrinmoyee Maa er pujo) was started on 994 AD, which makes it the oldest Durga Puja in the entire Bengal region including today's Bangladesh, Odisha and Tripura.

Municipality

During the period 1990–2010, the 175-year-old Bishnupur Municipality was controlled by INC. From 2010 it is controlled by TMC.
Present Municipality chairman is the longest serving chairman of Bishnupur Municipality.

Image gallery

References

External links

Official Website of Bishnupur Panchayat Samity
Official Website of Bishnupur
Official Website of SDO Bishnupur
 Bishnupur page in Government of India website
 Official Website of Bishnupur High School

Cities and towns in Bankura district
Tourist attractions in Bankura district
Cities in West Bengal